The 1990 U.S. Open was the 90th U.S. Open, held June 14–18 at Course No. 3 of Medinah Country Club in Medinah, Illinois, a suburb northwest of Chicago. Hale Irwin became the oldest U.S. Open champion by defeating Mike Donald at the 91st hole, the first in sudden-death, after the two tied in the 18-hole Monday  It was Irwin's third U.S. Open title, with previous wins in 1974 and 1979. Implemented decades earlier, it was the first use of sudden-death in the U.S. Open;  the last tie in a playoff was in 1946. Sudden death was needed again in 1994 and 2008.

It was the third U.S. Open at Medinah, which previously hosted in 1949 and 1975. It later hosted the PGA Championship in 1999 and 2006, and the Ryder Cup in 2012.

Irwin was without a PGA Tour win in five years and 11 years removed from his last U.S. Open victory in 1979; he received a special exemption from the USGA to enter the tournament. Irwin began the final round in a tie for 20th place, four strokes back of leaders Billy Ray Brown and Donald. Playing well ahead of the leaders, Irwin fired a round of 67, which included a  birdie putt at the 72nd hole. After the putt dropped, he provided the championship with its enduring image as he took a "victory lap" around the green, high-fiving spectators. Irwin, however, had not won the championship yet as there were still golfers on the course with a chance to overtake him. A two-putt par on the last tied him with Irwin, forcing an 18-hole Monday playoff. Brown and Nick Faldo finished a stroke out of the playoff in a tie for third place.

In the playoff, Donald took a two-shot lead to the 16th tee. Needing a birdie, Irwin responded with a brilliant 2-iron approach and sank the putt to get within one. After both players parred the 17th, Irwin made par at the last, giving Donald a chance to win the championship. His par putt, however, narrowly slid by, implementing sudden-death for the first time in U.S. Open history. (Previous playoff ties went on to play additional full rounds, the last of which was in 1946.) Irwin needed just one more hole, recording a birdie at the par-4 1st to win the championship.

At , Irwin became the oldest winner of the U.S. Open, surpassing the record set in 1986 by Raymond Floyd by fifteen months. The oldest winner of a major is Phil Mickelson, 50 at the PGA Championship in 2021.

Curtis Strange attempted to win his third consecutive U.S. Open; he began the final round just two off the lead, but a final round 75 dropped him back to 21st place. Amateurs Phil Mickelson and David Duval made their major championship debuts, finishing in 29th and 56th place, respectively.

Scoring conditions were ideal throughout the week, with a record 39 under-par rounds in the first round and 47 in the second. A total of 28 players finished the tournament under-par, a new U.S. Open record.

Past champions in the field

Made the cut

Missed the cut

Source:

Round summaries

First round
Thursday, June 14, 1990

Second round
Friday, June 15, 1990

Amateurs: Duval (E), Mickelson (+1).

Third round
Saturday, June 16, 1990

Final round
Sunday, June 17, 1990

Amateurs: Phil Mickelson (E), David Duval (+5).

Scorecard
Final round

Cumulative tournament scores, relative to par

Source:

Playoff 
Monday, June 18, 1990

Irwin and Donald tied in the 18-hole playoff at 74 (+2).
The sudden-death playoff began on hole #1 (385 yd., par 4), which Irwin (3) birdied and Donald (x) did not.

Scorecard

{|class="wikitable" span = 50 style="font-size:85%;
|-
|style="background: Pink;" width=10|
|Birdie
|style="background: PaleGreen;" width=10|
|Bogey
|}
Source:

References

External links
USGA Championship Database

U.S. Open (golf)
Golf in Illinois
Medinah, Illinois
U.S. Open
U.S. Open (golf)
U.S. Open
U.S. Open